Timothy Pyznarski (born February 4, 1960) is a former professional baseball player, who played in Major League Baseball (MLB) for the San Diego Padres in 1986. He was selected 15th in the first round of the 1981 MLB Draft by the Oakland Athletics.

Pyznarski grew up on the South side of Chicago, attending Marist High School. Pyznarski led Marist to the IHSA Class AA State Championship in 1978. He then went on to attend Eastern Illinois University, where he set several offensive records with the Eastern Illinois Panthers baseball team. After a successful career in Minor League Baseball, highlighted by The Sporting News Minor League Player of the Year Award and Topps Minor League Player of the Year Award in 1986, Pyznarski had a brief stint in the majors, appearing in 15 games for the 1986 San Diego Padres, where he compiled a .238 batting average (10-for-42).

Pyznarski is now an assistant coach at Marist, and has a daughter Mandy, who is a senior at Marist.

Career
He played in the MLB for the San Diego Padres (1986) and the Modesto A's (1981), West Haven A's (1982), Albany A's (1983), Tacoma Tigers (1984), Las Vegas Stars (1985-86), and Denver Zephyrs, Rochester Red Wings and Omaha Royals. His 1987 Topps baseball card stated he was 6'2", weighed 195 pounds and batted and threw right handed.

External links

1960 births
Living people
San Diego Padres players
Major League Baseball first basemen
Baseball players from Chicago
Modesto A's players
West Haven A's players
Albany A's players
Tacoma Tigers players
Las Vegas Stars (baseball) players
Denver Zephyrs players
Rochester Red Wings players
Omaha Royals players
Eastern Illinois Panthers baseball players
Pacific Coast League MVP award winners